Ger Cunningham (born 1972) is an Irish retired hurler who played for the Limerick minor team.

Born in Knockainey, County Limerick, Cunningham first arrived on the inter-county scene at the age of seventeen when he first linked up with the Limerick minor team. At club level Cunningham played with Knockainey.

In retirement from playing Cunningham became involved in team management and coaching. At club level he was an All-Ireland-winning coach with Newtownshandrum before steering Thurles Sarsfields to a first championship in over thirty years. Cunningham has served as a selector with the Limerick minor and senior teams, before becoming technical coach with the Laois senior team. On 28 May 2015 he was appointed interim manager of the Laois senior team.

Honours

Coach

Newtownshandrum
All-Ireland Senior Club Hurling Championship (1): 2004
Munster Senior Club Hurling Championship (1): 2003
Cork Senior Club Hurling Championship (1): 2003

Thurles Sarsfields
Tipperary Senior Club Hurling Championship (1): 2005

University of Limerick
Fitzgibbon Cup (1): 2011

References

1972 births
Living people
Knockainey hurlers
Limerick inter-county hurlers
Hurling managers
Hurling selectors